The Altenburg is a hill in the county of Schwalm-Eder-Kreis, Hesse, Germany.

On its flat hilltop are the remains of a fairly large, fortified settlement from the Bronze Age and Iron Age.

Hills of Hesse
Hill castles